The 1986 Pot Black was the eighteenth edition of the professional invitational snooker tournament, and the last of its original run. It took place in December 1985, but was broadcast in 1986. The tournament was held at Pebble Mill Studios in Birmingham, and featured sixteen professional players in a knock-out system. All matches until the semi-final were one-frame shoot-outs, the semi-final was won by aggregate score over two frames, and the final was decided by the best of three frames.

Broadcasts were on BBC2 and started at 22:10 on Thursday 16 January 1986, later than in previous series. David Icke presented, with Ted Lowe as commentator and John Williams as referee.

The only Pot Black debut in this series was that of Patsy Fagan. All the competitors in this series were 1985 World Championship last-16 players. Jimmy White won the event, beating Kirk Stevens 2–0 with a break of 106 in the last frame.

Main draw

Final

References

Pot Black
Pot Black
Pot Black
Pot Black